The Seasonal Agricultural Worker Program (SAWP) is a Government of Canada program that was introduced by the Pearson government in 1966 between Canada and Jamaica but has since expanded to include Mexico and numerous other Caribbean countries. It is intended to allow Canadian farm employers to hire workers from Mexico and the Caribbean on temporary visas during the planting and harvesting seasons when employers are unable to hire local workers to fulfill their labour demands.

The program, administered jointly by Employment and Social Development Canada with Citizenship and Immigration Canada, is available to those who are at least 18 years of age, from one of the participating countries, qualify under the immigration laws and the sending country and agree to the employment contract. Those workers are  eligible for the Canada Pension Plan and certain Employment Insurance benefits (excluding "special benefits" such as maternal, parental and compassionate care benefits). Workers are also subject to income tax laws.

History 
The issue of a lack of workers was first recognized in the mid-1960s when there were not enough workers to fill the needs of farms that needed their crop picked as well as planted at the beginning of the season. The government saw a need to form a program to help fill the gap of labor and farms in need of workers. By 1966 the Seasonal Agriculture Workers Program was formed and utilized by Ontario. It began as a partnership between Canada and the Caribbean country of Jamaica and has since grown to many other Caribbean countries and Mexico. As of 2005 there were 18,000 migrant workers coming into the country annually, mainly working in Ontario.

Criticism
In 2022, the program has received increased media scrutiny following a string of worker deaths and an open letter from Jamaican migrant workers to the Jamaican Ministry of Labour likening conditions in Ontario to 'systematic slavery.'

References

External links
 Seasonal Agricultural Worker Program

1966 establishments in Canada
Canada–Caribbean relations
Canada–Mexico relations
Canadian immigration law
Foreign relations of Canada